Costabona (in Spanish and Catalan, Costabonne in French) is a mountain of Catalonia, on the border between Spain and France. Located in the Pyrenees, it has an altitude of 2464 metres above sea level.

See also
Mountains of Catalonia

References

Mountains of Catalonia
Mountains of the Pyrenees
Two-thousanders of Spain
Two-thousanders of France
Emblematic summits of Catalonia